Daddy is a 1917 British silent drama film directed by Thomas Bentley and starring Langhorn Burton, Peggy Kurton and William Lugg. After his musician dies his young son goes to live with a violin manufacturer falling in his love with his daughter as he grows up.

Cast
 Langhorn Burton as John Melsher
 Peggy Kurton as Elsie Vernon
 William Lugg as Andrew Vernon
 M. R. Morand as John Melsher
 Charles Macdona as Farmer Bruff
 Eric Barker as John, as a child
 Audrey Hughes as Elsie, as a child

Bibliography
 Low, Rachael. History of the British Film, 1914-1918. Routledge, 2005.

External links

1917 films
1917 drama films
British drama films
1910s English-language films
Films directed by Thomas Bentley
British silent feature films
British black-and-white films
1910s British films
Silent drama films